Tatar-Ulkanovo (Tatar-Olqan) is a rural locality (a selo) and the administrative centre of Tatar-Ulkanovsky Selsoviet, Tuymazinsky District, Bashkortostan, Russia. The population was 691 as of 2010. There are 16 streets.

Geography 
Tatar-Ulkanovo is located 17 km east of Tuymazy (the district's administrative centre) by road. Chuvash-Ulkanovo is the nearest rural locality.

References 

Rural localities in Tuymazinsky District